The International Marine Certification Institute (acronym: IMCI) was established in Brussels, Belgium as an independent certification organisation to serve the interests of the European and International recreational boating industry. 

With the establishment of the European Communities Directive for Recreational Craft (94/25/EC), IMCI is able to provide certification services to manufacturers who desire to market their boats, yachts, and certain components in the European market.

IMCI has a team of 47 qualified international inspectors for the certification process. They represent 21 countries not only of the EU and their experience and backgrounds ensure a quality IMCI certification program what emphasizes strict compliance with the essential elements or the Directive. These Inspectors will support and advise clients during the process.

References

External links 
 International Marine Certification Institute

Maritime organizations